Geobacter metallireducens is a gram-negative metal-reducing proteobacterium. It is a strict anaerobe that oxidizes several short-chain fatty acids, alcohols, and monoaromatic compounds with Fe(III) as the sole electron acceptor. It can also use uranium for its growth and convert U(VI) to U(IV).

Geobacter metallireducens was discovered by Derek Lovley at UMass Amherst in 1993. It is an iron-reducing bacteria and it has been thought that the microbe could be used to treat industrial sites where "cyanide-metal complexes" have formed to contaminate the site. Geobacter metallireducens becomes motile when necessary, producing a flagellum in order to relocate when environmental conditions become unfavorable. 

The genome of Geobacter metallireducens has a chromosome length of 3,997,420 bp. It has a circular bacterial chromosome, meaning there are no free ends of DNA. The shape is roughly like that of an egg. Geobacter metallireducens also has a GC content of 59.51%.  The plasmid has a lower GC content, of  52.48%, and is 13,762 bp in length. The plasmid encodes a stabilizing protein, RelE/ParE, which allows Geobacter metallireducens to adapt and thrive in different and new environmental conditions.

G. metallireducens has been demonstrated to reduce chloramphenicol (CAP) to complete dechlorination products under pure culture conditions. Research utilizing cyclic voltammograms and chronoamperometry revealed that the bacteria exhibited a negative correlation CAP removal efficiency with initial CAP dosages, displaying the organism's potential application of bioremediation in environments polluted by antibiotics.

See also 

 Shewanella putrefaciens
 Paraburkholderia fungorum

References

Further reading

External links 
 Geobacter at the LPSN
 
 Type strain of Geobacter metallireducens at BacDive –  the Bacterial Diversity Metadatabase

Thermodesulfobacteriota
Bacteria described in 1993